Daviesia nova-anglica is a species of flowering plant in the family Fabaceae and is endemic to northern New South Wales. It is an erect shrub with arching branches, sharply-pointed, egg-shaped to narrow egg-shaped phyllodes, and yellow flowers with red markings.

Description

Taxonomy and naming
Daviesia nova-anglica was first formally described in 1990 by Michael Crisp in the journal Australian Systematic Botany from specimens collected east of Tenterfield in 1984.

Distribution
This species of pea mainly grows in sandy soil, usually derived from granite, in open forest with a scrubby understorey. It mainly occurs on the Northern Tablelands of New South Wales.

References

nova-anglica
Flora of New South Wales
Plants described in 1990
Taxa named by Michael Crisp